Delta High School is a high school in Delta Junction, Alaska operated by the Delta/Greely School District.

References

External links
 

Buildings and structures in Southeast Fairbanks Census Area, Alaska
Public high schools in Alaska
Schools in Unorganized Borough, Alaska